Florent Ahmed Groberg (born May 8, 1983) is a French-American soldier, retired United States Army officer and civilian employee of the United States Department of Defense. Born in France to an American father and Algerian mother, he became a naturalized United States citizen in 2001. He renounced his French citizenship prior to joining the United States Army in 2008. He served in the War in Afghanistan where, in August 2012, he was severely injured attempting to thwart a suicide bomber. On November 12, 2015, Groberg received the nation's highest award for military valor, the Medal of Honor, for his actions.

Early life and education
Groberg was born in Poissy, France, near Paris, on May 8, 1983. His mother, Klara, who is French, is of Algerian descent. Groberg has never met his biological father. He was raised by his mother and adoptive stepfather, American Larry Groberg, originally from Indiana. Larry was a businessman and his job took him around the world. The family lived in the Paris region until Florent was 6, then moved to Spain and back to France. He did not speak English until he was 11 years old.

When Groberg was in middle school, his family moved to the Chicago area before they settled in Potomac, Maryland, where he continued his studies in French at Lycée Rochambeau in Bethesda, Maryland, before graduating from nearby Walter Johnson High School in June 2001. Groberg became a naturalized U.S. citizen on February 27, 2001. Groberg attended the University of Maryland, College Park and competed in varsity track and cross country. In May 2006, Groberg graduated from the University of Maryland with a Bachelor of Science degree in Criminology and Criminal justice.

On May 14, 2017, Groberg graduated from the University of Maryland University College (UMUC) with a Master of Science degree in Management with a specialization in Intelligence Management. He also delivered the commencement keynote speech.

Military career
He entered the United States Army in July 2008 and attended Officer Candidate School at Fort Benning, Georgia. He received his commission as an infantry officer on December 4, 2008. After completing Infantry Officers' Basic Course, Mechanized Leaders Course, US Army Airborne and US Army Ranger Schools, he was assigned to the 4th Infantry Division at Fort Carson, Colorado, as a platoon leader in the 2nd Battalion, 12th Infantry Regiment.

In Afghanistan

In November 2009, Groberg deployed to Afghanistan as part of Task Force Lethal, with responsibility for the Pech River Valley in Afghanistan's Kunar Province.

Upon returning home in June 2010, Groberg continued serving as a platoon leader until he was reassigned as an infantry company executive officer from October 2010 to November 2011. He was then assigned as the brigade Personal Security Detachment (PSD) commander for 4th Infantry Brigade Combat Team, 4th Infantry Division. He deployed again to Kunar Province, Afghanistan, in February 2012, with Task Force Mountain Warrior. He was promoted to captain in July 2012.

On the morning of August 8, 2012, Groberg served as a PSD commander for Task Force Mountain Warrior — responsible for the safety of 28 coalition and Afghan National Army (ANA) personnel, including several principals: two brigade commanders, three battalion commanders, the brigade command sergeant major, a battalion command sergeant major and an ANA battalion commander.

The patrol's escort mission included moving on foot from Forward Operating Base Fiaz to the provincial governor's compound in Asadabad, Kunar, Afghanistan for a weekly security meeting.

As the patrol advanced towards the governor's compound, they reached the choke point along the route, a small bridge spanning a canal feeding the Kunar River. The patrol halted near the bridge as two motorcycles approached from the opposite direction. The motorcyclists began crossing the bridge, but stopped midway before dismounting and retreating in the opposite direction.

As the patrol observed the motorcyclists, Groberg also spotted a lone individual near the left side of the formation, walking backwards in the direction of the patrol. The individual did not cause immediate alarm as there were other local civilians in the area.

However, when the individual made an abrupt turn towards the formation, Groberg saw he was wearing a suicide vest. He rushed the suspect and shoved him away from the patrol. Groberg, aided by fellow soldier Sgt. Andrew Mahoney, grabbed the suicide bomber and physically dragged him away from the formation.

Groberg tackled the suicide bomber, who then detonated his device, sending Groberg flying 15 to 20 feet away. A second suicide bomber, who was hidden behind a small structure, instantly detonated his device; according to the Army, he detonated prematurely because of Groberg's actions to stop the first bomber. Three U.S. military personnel (U.S. Army Command Sgt. Maj. Kevin J. Griffin, U.S. Army Maj. Thomas E. Kennedy, and U.S. Air Force Maj. Walter D. Gray) and U.S. Foreign Service Officer Ragaei Abdelfattah from the U.S. Agency for International Development were killed and several others were injured.

Despite the loss of life, Groberg's actions prevented the bombers from detonating their devices as planned, which could have killed many more on the patrol.

As a result of his actions, Groberg sustained the loss of 45 to 50 percent of his left calf muscle with significant nerve damage, a blown eardrum, and a mild traumatic brain injury. Groberg spent his recovery at Walter Reed National Military Medical Center from August 2012 through May 2015. He was medically retired from Company B Warriors, Warrior Transition Battalion, as a captain, on July 23, 2015.

Medal of Honor

For his August 2012 actions, Groberg received the Medal of Honor, the highest military honor in the United States. Groberg is the 19th recipient of the Medal of Honor after the Vietnam War, the first foreign-born recipient since the Vietnam War and the 10th living recipient. President Barack Obama awarded the Medal of Honor to Groberg on November 12, 2015 at a ceremony at the White House.

In a Veterans Day post the day before the ceremony, Obama shared a video about Groberg on Facebook, with the words:

The official citation reads;

Personal life
Groberg married Carsen Alexa Zarin on November 17, 2018, who is originally from Saint Louis, Missouri and is of Jewish ancestry. Although a self-described lifelong Republican, he endorsed Hillary Clinton in the 2016 United States presidential election and spoke at the 2016 Democratic National Convention.

Awards and decorations
Groberg has been awarded the following:

Captain Groberg has earned two Overseas Service Bars.

See also

 List of post-Vietnam Medal of Honor recipients
 List of foreign-born Medal of Honor recipients

References

External links

Groberg profile at US Army's Medal of Honor webpage
Medal of Honor ceremony for Groberg

1983 births
Living people
United States Army personnel of the War in Afghanistan (2001–2021)
American people of Algerian descent
French emigrants to the United States
Foreign-born Medal of Honor recipients
French-born Medal of Honor recipients
French people of American descent
French people of Algerian descent
Maryland Republicans
Naturalized citizens of the United States
United States Army Medal of Honor recipients
United States Army officers
United States Department of Defense officials
University of Maryland, College Park alumni
War in Afghanistan (2001–2021) recipients of the Medal of Honor
Recipients of the Meritorious Service Medal (United States)